Sight & Sound Theatres is an entertainment company that produces Bible stories live on stage. Based in Lancaster County, Pennsylvania, Sight & Sound operates two theaters: one in Ronks, Pennsylvania (formerly known as the Millennium Theatre) and the second in Branson, Missouri.

History 
Glenn and Shirley Eshelman started Sight & Sound in the summer of 1976, with a 10-week multimedia show The Wonder of It All in an auditorium rented from Lancaster Bible College. Based on that success, they built the original Sight & Sound Auditorium (renamed to Living Waters Theatre) on Pennsylvania Route 896 in Ronks, Pennsylvania. In July 1976, the Sight & Sound Auditorium opened for the performance of A Land of Our Own. Live actors and actresses were eventually added to the productions, and Behold the Lamb debuted as the first full-length live stage production at the original Sight & Sound Auditorium in 1987. A larger facility, the Sight & Sound Entertainment Centre opened in March 1991.

However, after the success of their productions Noah and the premiere run of The Miracle of Christmas, the Entertainment Centre caught fire in January 1997, destroying the facility and most of the costumes and sets that were stored in the shops.  The Living Waters Theatre was renovated to accommodate live stage productions until another large theater, originally called The Millennium Theater, was opened on September 1, 1998. The new theatre featured more than 2,000 seats, a  wraparound stage that can hold sets up to 40 feet high, and improved audio and visual effects.

Sight & Sound opened a second theater in Branson, Missouri in 2008, a near identical twin facility to the newest facility in Lancaster County, Pennsylvania.

On July 17th, 2022, Sight & Sound announced that they will be expanding to filmmaking through a production company named Sight & Sound Films. Their first film, I Heard the Bells, released in theaters in December 2022. Sight & Sound TV, an associated streaming service was launched in 2020 and offers filmed versions of past productions for online viewing.

Inaugural Show 

 The Wonder of It All: 1978

Shows at Living Waters Theatre (Originally Sight & Sound Auditorium) 

 A Land of Our Own: 1976
 Behold the Lamb: 1987–2006
 The Glory of Spring: 1997-?
 Celebrate America: 1997-?
 Abraham and Sarah: A Journey of Love: 2000–2004, 2008–2009
 Psalms of David: 2005–2007, 2010

Shows at Sight & Sound Entertainment Centre 

 The Eternal Flame: 1991–1992
 Noah: 1995–1996

Shows at Millennium Theatre in Lancaster, PA 

 Noah - The Musical: 1998–2001, 2004, 2013
 The Miracle of Christmas: 1998–2011, 2013, 2015, 2017, 2019, Upcoming 2023
 Behold The Lamb: 1999-2001, 2004-2006, 2009
 Daniel: 2002–2003, 2008
 Ruth: 2005–2006
 In the Beginning: 2007–2009
 Joseph: 2010–2011, 2015
 Jonah: 2012, 2017
 Moses: 2014–2015, Upcoming 2023
 Samson: 2016
 Jesus: 2018-2019
 Queen Esther: 2020-2021
 David: 2022

Shows in Branson, Missouri 

 Noah - The Musical: 2008–2011, 2020
 The Miracle of Christmas: 2008–2011, 2013, 2017, 2019, 2022
 Joseph: 2012–2013
 Jonah: 2014-2015
 Moses: 2016-2017
 Samson: 2018-2019
 Jesus: 2021-2022
 Queen Esther: Upcoming 2023

Fathom Events 

 Jonah: 2017
 Moses: 2018
 Noah: 2019
 I Heard the Bells: 2022

References

External links 
Official Sight & Sound Theatres website

Culture of Lancaster, Pennsylvania
Christian performing arts
Theatres in Pennsylvania
Religion in Lancaster, Pennsylvania
Christian theatre companies